The Kuki Inpi is the apex body of the Kuki people.

Kuki government
The key of the Kuki government is the Chiefship, which became known to the British colonial rule in India.  The King of Tripura is the National Chief, and all the Kuki Clan Chiefs (Phung Upas) and Village Chiefs (Kho Haosas) are linked up with and subordinate to him. The King is named “Kumpi,” equivalent to English word “emperor”.

Kuki Inpis
Kumpipu is the overall head of all the Kuki Inpis. The following are Gamkai Inpis in India and the United States of America:
Kuki Inpi, Delhi 
Kuki Inpi, US

See also 
 Kuki State Demand Committee

References 

Kuki tribes
Ethnic groups in Northeast India
Ethnic groups in Myanmar
Ethnic groups in Bangladesh
Tribes of Assam